Andrea Gaudenzi was the defending champion but lost in the first round to Gorka Fraile.

Carlos Moyá won in the final 6–3, 2–6, 7–5 against Younes El Aynaoui.

Seeds
A champion seed is indicated in bold text while text in italics indicates the round in which that seed was eliminated.

  Guillermo Cañas (quarterfinals)
  Younes El Aynaoui (final)
  Carlos Moyá (champion)
  Tommy Robredo (semifinals)
  Jarkko Nieminen (first round)
  Fernando González (second round)
  Mariano Zabaleta (second round)
  Jonas Björkman (first round)

Draw

External links
 Main draw
 Qualifying draw

Men's Singles
Singles